The 2023 Games of the Small States of Europe, also known as the XIX Games of the Small States of Europe or informally Malta 2023, is an upcoming sporting event, scheduled to be held in Valletta, Malta from 28 May to 3 June 2023.

Malta previously hosted the 1993 and 2003 editions of the Games. The 2023 installation was originally planned to be the XX Games rather than the XIX Games, but the 2021 edition in Andorra was cancelled due to the COVID-19 pandemic.

Candidacy and preparation
In February 2017, Julian Pace Bonello, the president of the Maltese Olympic Committee (MOC), announced that Malta would bid for the 2023 Games.

In June 2021, after the Games in Andorra had been cancelled, Marti Mandinco, the president of the Andorran Olympic Committee, handed over the presidency of the Games to Bonello.

In February 2022, the MOC officially launched the Games with Bonello saying he hoped the event would "make the country proud" and "serve as a catalyst to inspire young athletes". Malta hosted the Games of the Small States of Europe Assembly in June 2022, approving the final sports programme for the Games. The Maltese government committed to supporting the games and Maltese athletes with €5 million worth of funding through Sport Malta.

Logo and mascot
In December 2021, the MOC and the Ministry for Education's Centre for Physical Education and Sport launched a design competition for the Games' logo and mascot, open to children aged 10 to 18. Drawing inspiration from submissions, the logo was then designed by Concept Stadium and unveiled in June 2022 by Clifton Grima, the Minister for Education, Sports, Youth, Research and Innovation. The logo was said to "[merge] the famous Olympic rings with the sea, fish and a Maltese icon recognized by many - the eye symbol". The eye symbol is present in several different parts of Maltese culture such as charms against the evil eye or as a mark of spiritual identity on luzzu (traditional Maltese fishing boats), or on 'Il-Gardjola' (a distinctive watchtower in Senglea) representing guardianship and observance. The logo's overlapping colours represent "Malta's values of diversity and inclusion".

Games

Participating teams

  (details)
  (details)
  (details)
  (details)
  (details)
  (details)
  (details)
  (details)
  (details)

Sports
The following competitions are expected to take place:

References

External links
Official website

 
Games of the Small States of Europe
International sports competitions hosted by Malta
Multi-sport events in Malta
2023 in European sport
Small_States_of_Europe
2023 in Malta
Games of the Small States
Games of the Small States